Night Stalker: The Hunt For a Serial Killer is a 2021 American four-part true crime documentary miniseries about the serial killer Richard Ramirez. The series was executive produced by Tiller Russel, Eli Holzman, Aaron Saidman and Tim Walsh.

Cast
 Richard Ramirez
Gil Carrillo
 Frank Salerno
 Tony Valdez
 Laurel Erickson
 Paul Skolnick
 Pearl Carrillo
 Linda Arthur
 Zoey Tur
 Frank Falzon
 Anastasia Hronas
 Judith Kneiding Arnold
 Colleen Nelson
 Ester Petschar
 Don Nelson
 Patty Nelson
 Glen Creason

Episodes

Release 
Night Stalker: The Hunt For a Serial Killer was released on January 13, 2021, on Netflix.

Reception 
On the review aggregator website Rotten Tomatoes, the miniseries has a 71% approval rating, based on 34 reviews, with an average rating of 6.7/10. The website's consensus reads, "Though Night Stalker: The Hunt for a Serial Killer succumbs to the sensational side of true crime, it paints a fascinating, chilling portrait of a killer and the city he terrorized."

References

External links
 
 

2021 American television series debuts
2021 American television series endings
2020s American television miniseries
2020s American documentary television series
Documentary television series about crime in the United States
English-language Netflix original programming
Netflix original documentary television series
Richard Ramirez